Laurent Redon (born 5 August 1973) is a former race car driver from Loire, France.

Redon began his professional racing career in the French Formula Three Championship, winning it in 1995. He then moved to International Formula 3000 where he finished 8th in the points for DAMS in 1996 and 9th for Super Nova Racing the following year. His best F3000 finish was a third place at A1-Ring in 1997.

He was then a test driver for the Formula One teams Minardi in 1998 and Benetton in 1999 and also competed for the top team in the Sports Racing World Cup JB Geisse Team Ferrari in 1999. In 2001 he drove in the European Le Mans Series and FIA Sportscar Championship for Pescarolo Sport, winning races in both series and finishing 13th in the 2001 24 Hours of Le Mans. After that he drove for Mi-Jack Conquest Racing in the Indy Racing League IndyCar Series beginning with the final two races of the 2001 season. He returned to the team for a full year in 2002, including the 2002 Indianapolis 500, with a best finish of 3rd at California Speedway. He finished 12th in points and won rookie of the year honors. He did not return to the series the following year and came back to France because of the birth of his girl, becoming the first and only series rookie of the year to do so. He later operated a racing team that competed in the Superleague Formula.

Racing career results

Complete International Formula 3000 results
(key) (Races in bold indicate pole position) (Races in italics indicate fastest lap)

24 Hours of Le Mans results

IndyCar Series results
(key)

References

External links
  (Archived)
 

1973 births
Living people
IndyCar Series drivers
Indianapolis 500 drivers
French racing drivers
French Formula Three Championship drivers
International Formula 3000 drivers
24 Hours of Le Mans drivers

Pescarolo Sport drivers
DAMS drivers
Super Nova Racing drivers
Conquest Racing drivers
OAK Racing drivers
Fortec Motorsport drivers